Atokasaurus is an extinct genus of scincomorph lizard from the Early Cretaceous of Oklahoma. The type and only species is Atokasaurus metarsiodon, named in 2002 on the basis of a single isolated lower jaw bone found within the Antlers Formation in Atoka County. It is similar in appearance to extinct lizards in the family Paramacellodidae and may itself be a paramacellodid, although the phylogenetic relationships of the group are uncertain. Atokasaurus differs from other paramacellodids in having teeth in the lower jaw with enlarged bases and an S-shaped profile when viewed edge-on.

References

Early Cretaceous reptiles of North America
Cretaceous lizards
Fossil taxa described in 2002